A lifebuoy is a life-saving buoy designed to be thrown to a person in water, to provide buoyancy and prevent drowning. Some modern lifebuoys are fitted with one or more seawater-activated lights, to aid rescue at night.

Other names 
Other names for "lifebuoy" include safety wheel, lifebelt, water wheely, ring buoy, life ring, lifering, lifesaver, life donut, life preserver, Perry buoy, or Kisbee ring. The "Kisbee ring", sometimes "kisby ring" or "kisbie ring", is thought to be named after inventor Thomas Kisbee (1792–1877), a British naval officer.

Description 

The lifebuoy is usually ring- or horseshoe-shaped personal flotation device with a connecting line allowing the casualty to be pulled to the rescuer in a boat. They are carried by ships and are also located beside bodies of water that have the depth or potential to drown someone. They are often subjected to vandalism which, since the unavailability of lifebuoys could lead to death, may be punished by fines (up to £5,000 in the United Kingdom) or imprisonment. 

The UK Royal Life Saving Society considers lifebuoys unsuitable for use in swimming pools because throwing one into a busy pool could injure the casualty or other pool users. In these locations, lifebuoys have been superseded by devices such as the torpedo buoy.

In the United States, Coast Guard approved lifebuoys are considered Type IV personal flotation devices. At least one Type IV PFD is required on all vessels 26 feet or more in length.

Leonardo da Vinci sketched a concept for a safety wheel, as well as for buoyant shoes and balancing sticks for walking on water.

Gallery of types of lifebuoys

See also

References

External links
 
 

Rescue equipment
Buoyancy devices